The Bubble Factory is an independent film production company founded by former MCA Inc. president/COO Sid Sheinberg with his sons, Jon and Bill. The company was formed after MCA was taken over by Seagram in June 1995. The Bubble Factory was financed by Seagram and produced films for release by Universal, with budgets in the $30–50 million range. Sheinberg, however, could take a film to another studio if Universal passed.

In June 1997, The Bubble Factory and Universal ended its partnership, owing to the disappointing box-office of the former's output. The Sheinbergs subsequently relaunched The Bubble Factory as an independent operation.

The name of the company reportedly came from Sid Sheinberg's wife, Lorraine Gary. When a reporter came to interview Sid, Gary responded that her husband was in their backyard with their grandchildren blowing bubbles.

Filmography
 Flipper (1996)
 The Pest (1997)
 That Old Feeling (1997)
 McHale's Navy (1997)
 A Simple Wish (1997)
 For Richer or Poorer (1997)
 Dunce's Diner (1998)
 Slappy and the Stinkers (1998)
 Playing Mona Lisa (2000)
 Death of a Salesman (2001)
 Bad Girls from Valley High (2005)
 Made in Brooklyn (2007)
 The Devil's Tomb (2009)
 Creature (2011)
 What Lola Wants (2015)
 Chapter & Verse (2017)
 Half Magic (2018)

References

Film production companies of the United States
American independent film studios
1995 establishments in California